The 1889 Brown Bears football team represented Brown University in the 1889 college football season.

Schedule

References

Brown
Brown Bears football seasons
Brown Bears football